Kvissel railway station is a railway station serving the village of Kvissel west of Frederikshavn in Vendsyssel, Denmark.

The station is located on the Vendsyssel railway line from Aalborg to Frederikshavn, between Tolne station and Frederikshavn station. It opened in 1871. The train services are operated by the railway company Nordjyske Jernbaner which runs frequent regional train services from the station to Aalborg and Frederikshavn.

History 
The station opened in 1871 as a railway halt on the new Vendsyssel railway line as the section from Nørresundby to Frederikshavn opened on 15 August 1871. It was promoted to a station in 1877, and the station building was constructed.

On 7 January 1879, at the opening of the Limfjord Railway Bridge, the Vendsyssel line was connected with Aalborg station, the Randers-Aalborg railway line and the rest of the Danish rail network.

The station was closed in 1982 but continued as a railway halt. In 2017, operation of the regional rail services on the Vendsyssel Line to Aalborg and Frederikshavn were transferred from DSB to the local railway company Nordjyske Jernbaner.

Architecture 
The station building from 1877 was designed by the Danish architect N.P.C. Holsøe.

Train services 
The train services are currently operated by the railway company Nordjyske Jernbaner which runs frequent regional train services from the station to Aalborg and Frederikshavn.

See also 
 List of railway stations in Denmark

References

Bibliography

External links

 Banedanmark – government agency responsible for maintenance and traffic control of most of the Danish railway network
 Nordjyske Jernbaner – Danish railway company operating in North Jutland Region
 Danske Jernbaner – website with information on railway history in Denmark
 Nordjyllands Jernbaner – website with information on railway history in North Jutland

Railway stations in the North Jutland Region
Railway stations opened in 1871
Niels Peder Christian Holsøe railway stations
Railway stations in Denmark opened in the 19th century